Edgar Espinoza (born 13 July 1928) is a Venezuelan former sports shooter. He competed at the 1964 Summer Olympics, 1968 Summer Olympics and the 1984 Summer Olympics.

References

External links
 

1928 births
Possibly living people
Venezuelan male sport shooters
Olympic shooters of Venezuela
Shooters at the 1964 Summer Olympics
Shooters at the 1968 Summer Olympics
Shooters at the 1984 Summer Olympics
Sportspeople from Caracas
Pan American Games medalists in shooting
Pan American Games gold medalists for Venezuela
Pan American Games silver medalists for Venezuela
Pan American Games bronze medalists for Venezuela
Shooters at the 1967 Pan American Games
20th-century Venezuelan people
21st-century Venezuelan people